Garth Marenghi's Darkplace is a British horror parody television series created by Richard Ayoade and Matthew Holness for Channel 4. The show focuses on fictional horror author Garth Marenghi (played by Holness) and his publisher Dean Learner (played by Ayoade), characters who originated in the stage show Garth Marenghi's Fright Knight.

The series is presented as a special release of the fictional television series Darkplace. Within the canon of the show, Darkplace was produced in the 1980s, but failed to gain an audience anywhere but Peru, eventually becoming a lost series. Saved footage has recently resurfaced, with Marenghi republishing with the intent of gaining interest from a modern audience. The "original footage" of the show is intercut or bookended with commentary from many of the "original" cast, where characters such as Marenghi and Learner reflect on what it was like to make the show. Darkplace parodies the fashion, special effects, production gaffes, and music of low-budget '80s television, as well as the modern practice of including commentary tracks on DVD releases of old films and television shows.

Darkplace was broadcast in a late-night timeslot, with very little advertising, and met with poor viewing figures. It built up a significant internet following, leading Channel 4 to repeat the series and produce a DVD release. In 2005, Channel 4's Film4 asked Holness and Ayoade to write a script for a film version of the series, but the project never saw further development.

The show was later broadcast in the United States on the Sci-Fi Channel and Adult Swim and is available to stream on Peacock.

Show overview

The spoof comedy series, released in 2004, lampoons 1980s television drama, particularly horror, sci-fi, and "the rampant egotism of self-appointed 'mastermind' authors". The show presents Garth Marenghi's Darkplace as though it were a real, low-budget television series, produced in the 1980s, and now getting its first screening, framed as part of a director's commentary series. Darkplaces fictional show-within-a-show includes deliberately poor production and special effects, sub-par acting, choppy editing and storylines that are "severely flawed and open-ended". This is interspersed with present-day interviews with the cast.

The series' fictional premise is that some time in the 1980s, best-selling horror author Garth Marenghi and his publisher/publicist, Dean Learner, made their own low-budget television series with a single intent: "to change the evolutionary course of Man over a series of half-hour episodes." Set in Darkplace Hospital, "over the very gates of Hell", in Romford, London, Garth Marenghi's Darkplace shows the adventures of Dr. Rick Dagless, M.D., as he fights the forces of darkness while simultaneously coping with the pressures of "day to day admin". Within this fictional context, Marenghi wrote 63 teleplays from which 50 shows were produced (in the commentary, he mentions that there were 67 episodes at one point, though it may have been intentional by Holness to show discontinuity); however, Channel 4 was eventually forced to reject the show due to its "radicality", though Marenghi also cites possible government suppression: "MI8, which is actually three levels above MI6, pulled the plug. And they did it because I knew the truth."

In 2004, due to the "worst artistic drought in broadcast history", Channel 4 decided to air six of the original episodes.

The makers of Darkplace endeavoured to make the show seem authentic. From "the retro Channel 4 logo at the start to the distortion of the analogue music track at the start of scenes", "the fashion, ... the texture of film stock", "[the] deliberately poor continuity, cheesy lines, wooden acting and cheap special effects"; it is delivered "in such a pitch perfect way you can't help but laugh". Also included are "present-day interviews", in which the character "Marenghi", with co-stars "Dean Learner"  and "Todd Rivers", comment on the show-within-the-show. The interview segments further reveal the delusional and self-absorbed attitudes of Marenghi and Learner.

As with promotion for their earlier Perrier Award-winning stage show, the official website speaks of Garth Marenghi, and other characters as though they were real people, while making no mention of the real actors. Press releases also contained "realistic looking fake back stories for Marenghi and the other characters instead of making any mention of what the real cast have appeared in", and an article by "Garth Marenghi" appeared in The Daily Telegraph discussing his "groundbreaking television series". "More than a few" people and media outlets were caught out by this fictional framing.

The show's musical soundtrack, ostensibly composed by "Stig Baasvik" (but with a further credit stating that it is "based on melodies whistled by Garth Marenghi") parodies the same subjects as the writing, and gained its actual composer, Andrew Hewitt, a BAFTA Nomination as Best New Composer for Film and T.V. (2004).

Characters
 Matthew Holness as Garth Marenghi, "author, dream weaver, visionary, plus actor", who plays Dr. Rick Dagless, M.D.: 'Dag' is a Vietnam and Falklands War veteran and former warlock. His accent is pitched somewhere between Kent and boring. He keeps a Magnum revolver on him at all times. His wife is played by Lydia Fox.
 Richard Ayoade as Dean Learner, Garth's publisher, who plays Thornton Reed, a hospital administrator who bears a trademark shotgun and answers to unseen hospital boss "Won Ton". Learner's acting is especially bad even by the standards of the series, which is remarked upon in some of the in-character cast interviews. Ayoade himself stated in an interview in the Scottish Metro that "My acting really is that shit. I'm not pretending". The character Reed was in the Korean War, in which he lost a testicle (and a knee) and became a POW.
 Matt Berry as Todd Rivers, an actor who plays Dr. Lucien Sanchez: Improbably handsome with the disconcerting habit of losing lip-synch, with "impossibly coiffured hair", and a voice an octave lower than it should be. He generally uses an automatic pistol (with a backup in a leg holster in case his original turns on him). He served with Dag in Vietnam. Most of Todd Rivers' lines are looped-in, with Matt Berry seemingly providing the most off-sync and over the top readings possible.
 Alice Lowe as Madeleine Wool, an actress who plays Dr. Liz Asher: a stereotypical fluffy blonde with occasional psychic powers (sometimes exacerbated by heightened emotion). Asher graduated from "Harvard College Yale", acing all her classes and getting an A. Madeleine Wool has disappeared since the making of the programme. It is implied through the in-character episode commentaries that Dean had something to do with her disappearance and claims she is probably dead and "buried in the Eastern Bloc – if she got a burial".

A few other (real) actors have recurring roles in the show-within-the-show: Kim Noble appears in every episode as Jim, a hospital worker whose main function is to listen to Dagless reel off a lengthy speech and respond with a "yes" or other monosyllabic reply, and Noble's real comedy partner Stuart Silver appears as "The Extra": a character whose name is unknown and has been a doctor, receptionist, keyboard soloist and barman. Julian Barratt also appears in three episodes as the hospital's vicar, whom Dagless refers to as "Padre". Graham Linehan and Stephen Merchant appear twice as the hospital porter and chef respectively. Noel Fielding appears as a mutant "Ape-oid" in Episode 4, "The Apes of Wrath".

Episodes 
This list is ordered by the original air dates on Channel 4 in the United Kingdom.

Reception
Rotten Tomatoes gives the series an 86% rating based on reviews from 22 critics.

Broadcasts
Darkplace originally aired in 2004. Only one series was produced. There is media speculation that the "average" or "poor" viewing figures led Channel 4 to decide against commissioning a second series.  Channel 4 started a re-run of the series in October 2006 and released the show on DVD in the same month, while allowing the show to be re-broadcast on Virgin Media's On-demand service. In 2005, it was reported that the channel's cinema division, Film Four, had asked Holness and Ayoade to write a script for a film version of their programme.

On 27 July 2006, Darkplace made its U.S. debut on the  Sci-Fi Channel.

The series had a spin-off, the spoof chat show Man to Man with Dean Learner, which began on 20 October 2006 on Channel 4. Dean's first guest was Garth Marenghi. During the interview with Garth a clip from the supposedly forthcoming movie, War of the Wasps, is shown, again featuring Dean Learner and his acting ability. Marenghi would also appear on the final episode of the series, which featured a clip from a video nasty that Garth and Dean had supposedly produced, which featured cameos from various Darkplace cast members.

As of 2022 Darkplace is available to watch on All 4 (Channel 4's free streaming service) and BritBox, and was screened on UK Gold in January 2016. In the United States it is available on Amazon Prime.

DVD
The complete series was released on DVD (PAL, Region 2 only) on 16 October 2006, including the following special features:
 Commentaries on all episodes in which the cast stay in character as Garth, Dean and Todd (Alice Lowe does not appear since Madeleine Wool was established in the series as being missing presumed dead for decades)
 A deleted scene (staged deliberately for DVD purposes)
 Test footage (staged deliberately for DVD purposes)
 Original "One Track Lover" single (extended version), along with the Darkplace theme and three "Darkplace Moodscapes" by composer Stig Baasvik (in reality the composer is BAFTA award-winning Andrew Hewitt)
 Over an hour of extra talking heads
 Photograph galleries (staged deliberately for DVD purposes)
 Original radio ads
 Original story-boards and story-board to scene comparisons
 An "easter egg" (containing bonus footage) accessible by selecting, and then fast-forwarding, the "Colour Bars" feature in the set-up menu
 An easter egg of the entire Darkplace television sound-track; this can be accessed by either clicking on the picture of Liz Asher in the setting menu (this method works only if you are watching the DVD on a PC), or selecting One Track Lover to listen to and pressing "previous", or by using your DVD player's "Go to Title" feature and then entering the title number 19. The sound-track is approximately thirty-eight minutes long, and is divided into twenty-four chapters.

The cover of the DVD also features a play on the DVD logo, which instead reads "DEANVD".

Matthew Holness and Richard Ayoade reprise their roles as Garth Marenghi and Dean Learner in Man to Man with Dean Learner, which is also available on DVD.

References

External links 

 Garth Marenghi's Darkplace at Channel4.com
 

 
2004 British television series debuts
2004 British television series endings
2000s British comedy television series
2000s British horror television series
2000s British comic science fiction television series
British medical television series
Channel 4 sitcoms
English-language television shows
British horror comedy television series
Romford
Television series set in the 1980s
Television shows set in London
Films scored by Andrew Hewitt